An explosion vent or rupture panel is a safety device to protect equipment or buildings against excessive internal, explosion-incurred pressures, by means of pressure relief. An explosion vent will relieve pressure from the instant its opening (or activation) pressure pstat has been exceeded. 

Several explosion vent panels can be installed on the same process vessel to be protected. Explosion vents are available in the versions self-destructive, non-self-re-closing and re-usable, self-re-closing. 

Explosion vent construction must balance the contradictory requirements "low inertia" and "high strength". Inertia negatively affects an explosion vent's efficiency. High strength is required to endure the considerable forces that move the vent's venting element in order to open the venting orifice. Unintended disintegration must not cause disintegrating parts turning into a missile.

The evaluation of an explosion vent's efficiency and its range of application are subject to rules. See National Fire Protection Association 68, EN 14797.

During normal venting, the explosion is freely discharged, allowing flames to exit the process being protected. When the protected vessel or pipe is located indoors, ducts are generally used to safely convey the explosion outside the building. However, ductwork has disadvantages and may result in decreased venting efficiency. Flameless venting, in combination with explosion vents, can extinguish the flame from the vented explosion without the use of expensive ducting, limitations to equipment location, or more costly explosion protection.

See also
 Blast damper
 Dust explosion
 Electrical equipment in hazardous areas
 Explosion protection
 Explosives safety
 Inert gas
 Pressure relief valve
 Pressure#Explosion or deflagration pressures
 Prestressed structure
 Rupture disc

References

Explosion protection
Safety engineering
Safety equipment